Tonho is a Portuguese (Brazilian Portuguese) masculine nickname and given name that is a diminutive form of Antônio and António used in Brazil. Notable people with this name include the following.

Nickname
Antônio dos Santos Nascimento, known as Tonho, (born 1938), Brazilian footballer
Antônio José Gil known as Tonho Gil (born 1957), Brazilian footballer

Middle name
Pedro Maria Tonha Pedalé, Angolan politician

See also

Toho (disambiguation)
Tondo (disambiguation)
Tongo (disambiguation)
Tonio (name)
Tonko
Tono (name)
Tonto (disambiguation)

Notes

Portuguese masculine given names